Cychrus puetzi is a species of ground beetle in the subfamily of Carabinae. It was described by Klienfeld, Korell & Wrase in 1996.

References

puetzi
Beetles described in 1996